John Watson (1685 – August 22, 1768) was an early American painter, born in Scotland.

Early life
Watson was born in Scotland in 1685, probably near Dumfries. He worked initially painting house interiors, before turning to portraiture.

Work in America
In 1715 he emigrated to Perth Amboy, New Jersey.  Watson bought property in the city east of Rector Street and south of St. Peter's Episcopal Church on the Perth Amboy bluffs and built himself a house in which to reside and one to keep his paintings.  Early historian William Dunlap believed this to be the first collection of art in America.  In 1776, his nephew, Alexander Watson, who was heir to his estate, withdrew from Perth Amboy, which was under pressure from colonial forces under General Hugh Mercer.  Soldiers raided Watson's collection and, according to Dunlap, probably distributed and destroyed many of the portraits of English heroes and kings.  Contrary to Dunlap's knowledge, however, numerous portraits by Watson still exist today.  The Historical Society of Pennsylvania has a portrait of Governor William Keith (shown on the left) and his wife, Lady Ann Keith née Newberry or Newbury, and the Brooklyn Museum has his portrait of Governor Lewis Morris.  The New Jersey Historical Society has two portraits: one of William Eier, the first mayor of Perth Amboy, and one of Governor William Burnet.  Watson died in 1768 and is buried in St. Peter's Episcopal Cemetery in Perth Amboy.

Gallery

Artworks

Attributed artworks

References

Sources
 Inventories of American Painting (IAP), Smithsonian Institution Research Information System(SIRIS): http://sirismm.si.edu/siris/aboutari.htm

1685 births
1768 deaths
18th-century American painters
18th-century American male artists
American male painters
Scottish emigrants to the United States
18th-century Scottish painters
Scottish male painters
People from Dumfries and Galloway
People from Perth Amboy, New Jersey
Painters from New Jersey
Scottish portrait painters
American portrait painters